Aestuariihabitans beolgyonensis is a Gram-negative, rod-shaped and non-motile bacterium from the genus of Aestuariihabitans which has been isolated from tidal flat from the southern coast of Korea.

References

External links
Type strain of Aestuariihabitans beolgyonensis at BacDive -  the Bacterial Diversity Metadatabase

Rhodobacteraceae
Bacteria described in 2014